Shamsul Islam Muhammad Nurunnabi Khan (1942 – 22 May 2019) was a Bangladeshi freedom fighter and writer. He was awarded Bir Bikrom for his contribution to the Liberation War of Bangladesh.

Early life and education
Nurunnabi Khan was born in 1942, into a Bengali Muslim family in the village of Lakshmidharpara, Ramganj, Noakhali District, Bengal Presidency (now in Lakshmipur District, Bangladesh). He was the eldest child of Habibullah Khan and Shamsunnahar Begum.

Khan completed his graduation from East Pakistan University of Engineering and Technology (now  Bangladesh University of Engineering and Technology) in electrical and electronics engineering. He was the president of East Pakistan University of Engineering and Technology Student League in 1967 and 1968. Later, he became vice president of his university's student union in 1969. He took part in the 1969 Mass Uprising.

Career
After completing graduation Nurunnabi Khan joined the Pakistan Army. He was in Quetta School of Infantry and Tactics in 1971. After the declaration of independence of Bangladesh he decided to take part in the Liberation War of Bangladesh. He came to Dhaka on 27 March 1971 to take part in the Liberation War of Bangladesh. He was appointed the captain of Delta Company in the Liberation War of Bangladesh.

Nurunnabi Khan took part in battles across the country. He took part in the battlefield of Bahadurabad, Chhatak, Gowainghat, Radhanagar, Chhotokhel, Salutikor and other places. After independence he was awarded Bir Bikrom for his contribution to the Bangladesh Liberation War in 1971.

Nurunnabi Khan joined Bangladesh Army after the Liberation of Bangladesh. He studied in Royal Military College of Science from 1973 to 1976 and achieved a degree in atomic engineering. He was suspended from Bangladesh Army in 1980 for an allegation of his involvement in an unsuccessful coup.

Nurunnabi Khan also wrote books about the Liberation of Bangladesh. His twelve books were published. He wrote books like Jiboner Juddho Juddher Jibon, Roumari Ronangon, Operation Bahadurabad and Operation Salutikor. He also established Columbia Prakashani for publishing books about the Liberation War of Bangladesh.

Death
Nurunnabi Khan died on 22 May 2019 at the age of 77.

References

2019 deaths
1942 births
Recipients of the Bir Bikrom
People from Ramganj Upazila
20th-century Bengalis
21st-century Bengalis
Bangladeshi male writers
Alumni of Cranfield University
Bangladesh University of Engineering and Technology alumni
Mukti Bahini personnel